Elvin Jake Javier Pascual (born November 11, 1988) is a Filipino professional basketball player for the NLEX Road Warriors of the Philippine Basketball Association (PBA). He was taken 8th overall by Barako Bull in the 2014 PBA draft.

Amateur career

Pascual initially attended his high school education at St. Rose Catholic School in Paniqui, Tarlac until 2004, when his brother brought him to Manila and encouraged him to apply for a basketball scholarship with Philippine Christian University.  On his own will, he personally came to PCU with the intent to join its seniors basketball team, as he was, at that time, a graduating high school student. Yet, he was advised by Bong Sales, then head coach of the PCU Baby Dolphins, to repeat his third year of high school to gain experience and be familiar with Manila basketball. Furthermore, he was then instructed to officially drop out from his fourth year high school studies in St. Rose Catholic School in Tarlac, and to bring with him his second year high school report card to officially enrol as a third year high 
school student at PCU. Mr. Sales facilitated his enrolment in PCU High School, enabling him to serve a one-year residency and play for a year with the Baby Dolphins.

In his only playing year at PCU, he was awarded both NCAA Juniors Rookie of the Year and Most Valuable Player of the NCAA Season 82, however, both awards were returned after it was found out that PCU High School falsified his documents to extend his high school eligibility, which resulted to the school's suspension from the NCAA that following season.

After he graduated at PCU, he transferred to San Beda College where he was supposed to play out his rookie season for the Red Lions in 2008, but the NCAA Management Committee (ManCom) decided to ban him due to the same eligibility issue he was involved in two years before. A week after, he was cleared to play for NCAA Season 84 by the league after an appeal by then-San Beda president Fr. Mateo De Jesus to the NCAA Policy Board, saying he did not knowingly violate league rules on misrepresentation.

At San Beda, he became a member of multiple Red Lions championship teams of 2008, 2010, 2011 and 2012. He was also awarded as Most Improved Player in 2009.

He was also a Gilas Cadet, and was invited to the Sinag Pilipinas national team pool that competed in the 2013 SEA Games.

While in the amateur ranks, he was awarded Best Player Of The Conference in the year 2013 as he played for the NLEX until its last season in the PBA Developmental League.

Professional career
On November 16, 2014, Pascual posted a career-high 22 points as he led Barako Bull to its first win against Kia in the 2014–15 PBA Philippine Cup.

On September 28, 2015, he was traded to the Star Hotshots in a six-player, four-team trade.

On December 9, 2016, Pascual was traded to the Alaska Aces in exchange for Rome dela Rosa.

On December 10, 2019, Pascual was traded to the Phoenix Pulse Fuel Masters in exchange for a 2020 second-round draft pick. On February 11, 2022, he signed a two-year contract extension with Phoenix Super LPG (formerly Phoenix Pulse).

On January 18, 2023, Pascual was traded to the NLEX Road Warriors in a three-team trade involving NLEX, Phoenix, and TNT Tropang Giga. He was reunited with NLEX head coach Frankie Lim, who was his college coach at San Beda. On March 1, Pascual signed a two-year extension with the team.

Career statistics

As of the end of 2022–23 season

PBA season-by-season averages

|-
| align=left | 
| align=left | Barako Bull
| 36 || 23.6 || .392 || – || .566 || 5.2 || 1.3 || .8 || .3 || 6.3
|-
| align=left | 
| align=left | Star
| 27 || 9.9 || .536 || – || .458 || 3.3 || .4 || .2 || .2 || 3.1
|-
| align=left rowspan=2| 
| align=left | Star
| rowspan=2|30 || rowspan=2|10.3 || rowspan=2|.488 || rowspan=2|– || rowspan=2|.553 || rowspan=2|2.8 || rowspan=2|.6 || rowspan=2|.4 || rowspan=2|.2 || rowspan=2|3.3
|-
| align=left | Alaska
|-
| align=left | 
| align=left | Alaska
| 29 || 9.9 || .456 || .333 || .323 || 3.2 || .7 || .5 || .7 || 3.2
|-
| align=left | 
| align=left | Alaska
| 33 || 14.0 || .407 || .000 || .326 || 3.9 || .7 || .6 || .4 || 3.9
|-
| align=left | 
| align=left | Phoenix
| 20 || 12.7 || .481 || .286 || .455 || 3.4 || .8 || .3 || .6 || 3.1
|-
| align=left rowspan=2| 
| align=left | Phoenix
| rowspan=2|30 || rowspan=2|11.2 || rowspan=2|.509 || rowspan=2|.000 || rowspan=2|.667 || rowspan=2|2.5 || rowspan=2|.6 || rowspan=2|.3 || rowspan=2|.3 || rowspan=2|1.9
|-
| align=left | NLEX
|-class=sortbottom
| align=center colspan=2 | Career
| 205 || 13.5 || .442 || .217 || .456 || 3.5 || .8 || .5 || .3 || 3.7

NCAA 

|-
| align="left" | 2008-09
| align="left" rowspan="5" | San Beda
| 18 || 18.8 || .464 || .500 || .550 || 5.7 || 1.0 || .7 || 1.1 || 5.6
|-
| align="left" | 2009-10
| 21 || 21.8 || .402 || .000 || .724 || 8.0 || 2.0 || .4 || .7 || 9.1
|-
| align="left" | 2010-11
| 17 || 19.4 || .409 || .353 || .578 || 6.4 || 2.6 || .4 || .9 || 7.4
|-
| align="left" | 2011-12
| 21 || 22.6 || .427 || .000 || .490 || 8.2 || 3.1 || .6 || 1.9 || 7.2
|-
| align="left" | 2012-13
| 21 || 24.5 || .407 || .500 || .609 || 8.2 || 1.1 || 1.1 || 1.2 || 9.5
|-class=sortbottom
| align="center" colspan=2 | Career
| 98 || 21.6 || .417 || .273 || .601 || 8.5 || 2.0 || .6 || 1.2 || 7.8

Personal life

Pascual was born and raised in Ramos, Tarlac.

References

1988 births
Living people
Alaska Aces (PBA) players
Barako Bull Energy draft picks
Barako Bull Energy players
Basketball players from Tarlac
Competitors at the 2011 Southeast Asian Games
Competitors at the 2013 Southeast Asian Games
Filipino men's basketball players
Magnolia Hotshots players
NLEX Road Warriors players
Philippines men's national basketball team players
Phoenix Super LPG Fuel Masters players
Power forwards (basketball)
Philippine Christian University alumni
San Beda Red Lions basketball players
Southeast Asian Games gold medalists for the Philippines
Southeast Asian Games medalists in basketball